Tainá Mayara da Paixão (born November 29, 1991 in Jundiaí) is a Brazilian basketball player for América Basquete Recife and the Brazilian national team, where she participated at the 2014 FIBA World Championship,  the 2015 Pan American Games. and the 2016 Summer Olympics.

References

1991 births
Living people
Brazilian women's basketball players
Point guards
Basketball players at the 2015 Pan American Games
Basketball players at the 2019 Pan American Games
Basketball players at the 2016 Summer Olympics
Olympic basketball players of Brazil
Basketball players from São Paulo
Pan American Games medalists in basketball
People from Jundiaí
Pan American Games gold medalists for Brazil
Medalists at the 2019 Pan American Games
Sportspeople from São Paulo (state)